Bruce D. Judd, FAIA, is a historic preservation architect based in Seaside, Florida, and San Francisco, California. He is a principal in the Bruce Judd Consulting Group in Seaside and a Consulting Founding Principal at the Architectural Resources Group in San Francisco. His projects have included surveying the historic African American community of Mound Bayou, Mississippi resulting in its being listed in the National Register of Historic Places. He has also consulted on the restoration of the Alamo Mission in San Antonio, Texas. Judd has directed more than 300 planning, rehabilitation, and expansion projects for architecturally significant buildings throughout the west and is a nationally recognized expert in his field. He has led rehabilitation and new construction projects for library, cultural, and performing arts facilities. He has also directed various high-profile projects including: master plan and restoration of the Hotel Del Coronado; repair and restoration of the San Francisco Conservatory of Flowers in Golden Gate Park, which received a National AIA Honor Award; master planning and seismic retrofit of the block-square Beaux-Arts style Pasadena City Hall which received LEED Gold certification; and rehabilitation of the historic Linde Robinson Laboratory for the Center for Global Environmental Ecology at Caltech in Pasadena, the first laboratory in a historic building to receive a LEED Platinum certification. Judd meets The Secretary of the Interior's Historic Preservation Professional Qualifications Standards in Architecture, Historic Architecture, Architectural History, and History.

Honors and memberships
In 1993, Judd was awarded "Preservationist of the Year" and was appointed as Fellow of the American Institute of Architects. In 1996, Judd was named by President Clinton as an Expert Member to the Advisory Council on Historic Preservation, the federal agency that oversees and advises on national preservation matters where he served for eight years. He served on the First Lady's Millennium Committee to Save America's Treasures. He has served on both the San Francisco and California AIA Committees on Historic Preservation, was former Chairman of the National AIA Committee on Historic Resources, and is an Advisor Emeritus and former Board of Trustees Member of the National Trust for Historic Preservation where he served for nine years. He served as a board member of Preservation Action for ten years, and is a former President of San Francisco Heritage. In 2006, the Architectural Resources Group received the AIA California Council, Firm of the Year and in 2005 the Conservatory of Flowers received a National Honor Award for Architecture, from the American Institute of Architects. Judd is also on the board of directors of the Frank Lloyd Wright Building Conservancy.

Registrations
 Registered Architect, State of Florida, No. AR95535
 Registered Architect, State of California, No. C-7910
 National Council of Registration Boards, NCARB, No. 21447

Publications
  "Frank Lloyd Wright's Historic Cars at Taliesin West", Hagarty Classic Cars Magazine, Spring 2015 Issue (http://www.hagerty.com/articles-videos/magazine)
  "The Historic Boots Court Motel at the Crossroads of America on Route 66", Hagarty Classic Cars Magazine, Fall 2014 Issue (http://www.hagerty.com/articles-videos/magazine)
  "The Changing Architectural Practice in the Age of Lean - Are sustainability and preservation driving forces in the market,  for now and the future?" Traditional Building Magazine February, 2009 
  "Strategies for Historic Preservation: Where Public and Private Interests Meet". Urban Land (April 2004): 78-79.
  Forum Journal Volume 14, Fall 1999 "Preservation Partners Look to the Next Century".
  Co-author with Stephen J. Farneth, "Affordable Housing Through Historic Preservation", published by the National Park Service, November 1995

Public lectures
  "Seaside, Florida: New Urbanism, Sustainability & Historic Preservation", National Trust for Historic Preservation Annual Conference, Indianapolis, (November 1, 2013)
  "Local Historic Preservation and the Certified Local Government Opportunity", Keynote, Regional Certified Local Government Conference, Tallahassee, FL (February 27, 2013)
  "The Economics of Historic Preservation", Economic Development Conference, The City of Daytona Beach, (February 4, 2012)
  "Economic Development Through Historic Preservation", Economic Development Conference, City of Daytona Beach, (February 4, 2012) 
  "Economic Benefits of Main Street: Embracing Historic Places - Making Life Better", The Alabama Council American Institute of Architects & Associated Builders & Contractors of Alabama (Destin, FL, June 9, 2011)
  "After the Storm - Lessons Learned from Natural Disasters", Alabama Historical Commission, Mobile, AL, August 13, 2010
  "The Public Architect's Role in Creating Successful Historic Preservation Projects", American Institute of Architects 2009 Annual Convention, Public Architecture Design Workshop, April 29, 2009
  "Connecting Historic Preservation and Sustainability", Keynote Address, Sixth Annual Forum on Preservation Practice: Sustainability and Preservation, Goucher College, Baltimore, MD, March 20, 2009
  "Recent Projects: Quintessentially California, Project: Pasadena City Hall, Pasadena, CA", Traditional Building Magazine, April, 2008, (http://www.traditional-building.com/Previous-Issues-08/AprilProject08Pasadena.html)
  "Seismic Forces: the Architectural Resources Group has fostered a strong sense of tradition on the West Coast while dealing with a broad range of clients and problems – including earthquakes".  By Kim A. O'Connell  (Traditional Building Magazine, October 2007 (http://www.traditional-building.com/Previous-Issues-07/OctProfile07.htm)
  "Historic Preservation as Economic Development", Joint Informational Meeting of the Landmarks Preservation Commission & the Downtown Area Plan Advisory Committee, 2006
  "Historic Preservation Pitfalls to Avoid," AIA National Convention (Las Vegas, NV, 2005)
  "Design Issues for New Construction Downtown," Urban Design Forum (Pasadena, CA, 2004)
  "Future Directions in Historic Preservation," AIA Annual Preservation Recognition Program (Cleveland, OH, 2003)
  "Architecture That Moves You: Relocating 12 Victorians in the Western Addition," San Francisco Architectural Heritage Fall Symposium (San Francisco, 2003)
  "Historic Preservation Tax Incentives Programs: National and State Success Stories," AIA National Convention (Charlotte, NC, 2002)
  "Security Challenges and Working with the Advisory Council on Historic Preservation," National Park Service and General Services Administration Conference on Balancing Public Safety and Protection of Historic Places (San Francisco, CA, 2002)
  "Architecture of the Great Society – Assessing the GSA Portfolio of Buildings Constructed During the 1960s and 1970s," General Services Administration Symposium (Washington, DC, 2000 – 2001)
  "The Art and Science of Preservation," Georgia Trust for Historic Preservation Annual Meeting (Atlanta, GA, 2000)
  "Thoughts on Urban Design and Historic Preservation," Pasadena Mayor's Urban Design Forum (Pasadena, CA, 2000)
  "The Future of the Recent Past in Architecture." National Park Service Conference. (Mt. Ranier, October 1999)
  "Impacts of Controlled Environment on Building Fabric."  AIA National Conference. (San Francisco, May 1998)
  "Solving Design Issues in Historic Development," Tax Incentives for Developing Historic Properties Conference (San Francisco, April 1998 and Chicago, July 1997)
  "The Presidio: The Typical and the Unique in Preservation Planning," Historic Preservation Short Course, University of Southern California (Los Angeles, August 1996 and 1997)
  "Tourism Potential of Historic Resources,"  National Association of Installation Developers, Annual Conference, Military Base Reuse: the State and Local Response (Sacramento, August 1996)
  "Challenges & Opportunities of Redeveloping Historic Properties at California Base Closure Sites," Historic Preservation Conference, Governor's Office of Planning & Research (San Diego, May 1996)
  "Planning for the Presidio's Future," Preserving the Spirit of the West, Preservation '95 Conference (San Francisco, December 1995)
  "The Mission Inn Rehabilitation, A Case Study in Preservation Philosophy," American Institute of Architects 1994 National Conference (Los Angeles, May 1994)

Selection panels and design juries
  Member, Architecture for Humanity Open Architecture Challenge International Competition, 2012
  Member 2008 GSA National Design, Art and Construction Awards Jury, 2008, Washington, DC
  Member GSA Selection Panel for the Department of Homeland Security Headquarters Consolidation at St. Elizabeth's Hospital, Historic Preservation, Adaptive Use and New Construction Project within a National Historic Landmark, National Capital Region, GSA, Washington, DC, 2008
  Member, AIA National Design Awards Jury, 2006
  Save America's Treasures Grant Program Juries, Washington, D. C., 1999, 2000, 2001, 2002
  GSA General Post Office and Tariff Commission Building Design Jury, Washington, D.C., September 1997
  Great American Homes Awards Program Jury, Washington, D.C., 1987 - 1996
  Design Awards Jury, the American Institute of Architects, Washington, D.C., August 1989

Selected projects
 Randolph Air Force Base, Historic Loftis Hall Rehabilitation, San Antonio, TX, 2014–present 
 The Alamo Mission, San Antonio, TX, 2011–present
 Mound Bayou, Mississippi, Historic Building Survey and National Register of Historic Places Nomination, 2012 - 2013
 Historic Fulton Mall Renovation Consulting, Fresno, CA 2012–present
 Economic Development and Heritage Tourism Workshops, City of Daytona Beach, FL, 2012
 Consultant to the Historic Vehicle Association, 2012 – present
 California Institute of Technology, Linde + Robinson Laboratory Global Center for Environmental Studies, Pasadena, CA
 The Varsity Theater Renovation, Palo Alto CA, 2011 - 2013
 The Hall Winery, St. Helena, CA 2010–present
 Residential Design Reviews, La Jolla and San diego, CA, 2010–present
 C. S. Lewis College, Survey and Analysis of Campus Resources, Northfield, MA, 2009 - 2011, 2014–present 
 Lincoln Place Apartment Homes Renovation, Venice, CA 2008 – present
 Hollywood Palladium Theater Exterior Restoration, Los Angeles, CA 2007 – 2008
 Sacramento Railyards, Central Shops, Conceptual Design for Rehabilitation, Sacramento, CA
 Conservatory of Flowers, Preservation and Damage Repair of Historic Greenhouse in Golden Gate Park San Francisco, CA
 Jewish Museum San Francisco, Rehabilitation of and Addition to Willis Polk-Designed Structure San Francisco, CA
 Goldman School of Public Policy, Seismic Strengthening and New Addition, University of California, Berkeley, CA
 Pasadena City Hall, Disabled Access, Restoration, and New Addition, Pasadena, CA
 Sunset Center, Rehabilitation and Expansion, Carmel, CA
 One Colorado Boulevard Commercial, Buildings Rehabilitation, Historic Preservation Consultant, Pasadena, CA
 Hotel Del Coronado, Rehabilitation and Restoration of National Landmark Hotel, Coronado Island, CA
 Mare Island Naval Station, Historic District Re-Use Plan, Vallejo, CA
 Mission Inn, Rehabilitation and Restoration, Riverside, CA

External links
 http://www.brucejudd.com
 https://web.archive.org/web/20141015140348/http://www.argsf.com/people/principal/bruce-judd

American architects
Living people
Preservationist architects
Year of birth missing (living people)
New Classical architects